Moonlight in Havana is a 1942 American film romantic comedy directed by Anthony Mann and featuring Allan Jones, Jane Frazee, and Marjorie Lord. This was Mann's second film as director. Choreography by Lester Horton.

Plot

Baseball star Johnny "Whizzer" Norton has been suspended by manager Eddie Daniels and the New York Blue Sox for his incorrigible behavior. When nightclub owner Barney Crane happens to hear Johnny singing, he offers him a job in the club where Gloria Jackson is currently the star performer.

Johnny is not interested until he hears Crane wants to take the whole troupe to Havana, Cuba, to entertain. Knowing that the Blue Sox have training camp in Havana, he agrees to the trip, which includes a boat voyage where the singers entertain.

Complications begin in Cuba as soon as Gloria comes to suspect Johnny's real reason for being there, while Patsy Clark, daughter of Blue Sox owner Joe Clark, shows a romantic interest in Johnny. He is reinstated by the team and quits the stage act, but has a change of heart, returning to show business and to Gloria.

Cast
 Allan Jones as Johnny Norton
 Jane Frazee as Gloria Jackson
 Marjorie Lord as Patsy Clark
 William Frawley as Barney Crane
 Don Terry as Eddie Daniels
 Wade Boteler as Joe Clark

References

External links
 
 
 
 

1942 films
1940s romantic musical films
American romantic musical films
American black-and-white films
1940s English-language films
Films directed by Anthony Mann
Films set in Havana
Universal Pictures films
1942 romantic comedy films
1942 directorial debut films
1940s American films